Ivica Vastić (born 29 September 1969) is an Austrian retired professional footballer, who played as a midfielder and as a striker, and head coach of Austria Wien U18. 

He played, amongst others for FK Austria Wien, SK Sturm Graz and LASK and the Austria national football team.

Club career
Born in Split, SR Croatia, then still part of Yugoslavia, Vastić started to play for local club Jugovinil (today GOŠK Adriachem), before joining RNK Split at time playing in Yugoslav third level. In 1991, he moved to Austria and signed with First Vienna FC. He subsequently also played for other Austrian clubs as VSE St. Pölten and Admira Wacker Mödling, and also had a half-season spell with Bundesliga side MSV Duisburg, where he made 10 league appearances without scoring a goal.

Sturm Graz
Vastić's most notable spell was with Sturm Graz between 1994 and 2002, during which he helped the club winning the Austrian Bundesliga two consecutive times in 1998 and 1999, as well as winning the Austrian Cup in 1996, 1997 and 1999. With the club, he also played in the group stages of the UEFA Champions League in the 1998/1999 and 1999/2000 seasons of the competition.

Japan and return to Austria

Vastić left Sturm for a one-season spell with Japanese club Nagoya Grampus Eight, after which he returned to Austria to spend two seasons with Austria Vienna before joining LASK in the summer of 2005. He performed well for LASK in the Erste Liga, the Austrian second division, and was the top goalscorer of the league in two consecutive seasons, scoring a total of 42 goals in 62 league appearances between 2005 and 2007. After helping LASK winning promotion to the Austrian Bundesliga in 2007, he went on to help the club finish sixth in the 2007/2008 Austrian Bundesliga season and himself finished the season as the club's top goalscorer in the league, having netted 13 goals in 32 appearances. Vastić announced his retirement on 18 May 2009, quitting professional football by 30 June 2009.

International career
Vastić became an Austrian national in 1996 and subsequently started to play for the Austria national football team. By 2005, Vastić had won a total of 46 caps and scored 12 goals as an Austrian international. He then disappeared from the team for a period before making a spectacular comeback in 2008, being a surprise selection in the Euro 2008 squad and scoring Austria's first ever goal in the European Championship, also becoming the oldest goalscorer in the history of the tournament.

1998 World Cup
Vastić's first appearance at a major tournament with Austria was at the 1998 FIFA World Cup finals in France, where he appeared in all of the team's three group matches and scored a last-minute equaliser in their second match at the tournament, a 1–1 draw against Chile. The Austrians were, however, eliminated from the tournament in the first round after recording two draws and one defeat.

Euro 2008
On 24 April 2008, Vastić was surprisingly added to Austria's preliminary squad for the UEFA Euro 2008 finals co-hosted by Austria and Switzerland in June. His last appearance for the national team prior to the call-up had more than two and a half years before, on 17 August 2005 in their 2–2 draw in a friendly match against Scotland. He then made his international comeback, winning his 47th cap, as a substitute in Austria's friendly match against Nigeria on 27 May 2008 and was eventually added to their final 23-man squad for the Euro 2008 finals, where he was the oldest player. In Austria's next friendly match three days later, he scored the team's fourth goal in their 5–1 victory over Malta.

On 8 June, Vastić made his Euro 2008 bow in the 1–0 defeat to his native Croatia, replacing Jürgen Säumel in the 61st minute.

On 12 June, Vastić appeared in Austria's second match of the tournament, a 1–1 draw with Poland, winning his 50th international cap as he replaced captain Andreas Ivanschitz in the 64th minute. In the match, he scored Austria's first goal in the final tournaments of the UEFA European Championship by netting an injury-time penalty to equalise, also becoming the oldest goalscorer of the European Championship finals at age , over four years older than Nené who held the record since 1984.

Coaching career

FC Waidhofen/Ybbs
On 16 June 2009, Vastić was named head coach of FC Waidhofen/Ybbs of the Regionalliga Ost coincidently the club began a cooperation with the former Vastic club LASK.
He started his coaching career very well, winning the Regionalliga Ost in 2009/10.

Austria Wien
Vastić changed to Austria Wien Amateurs in summer 2010 and was promoted to manager of the first team of Austria Wien in December 2011. He was sacked on 21 May 2012 and his contract was not renewed when it finished at the end of May.

SV Mattersburg

Vastić became head coach on 20 December 2013. He is signed to the end of the season with an option for two more years. He subsequently had his option picked up. On 23 April 2016, Austria Wien defeated SV Mattersburg 9–0.

Personal life
Vastić has been married to his wife Annie for more than 20 years. Together they have three children. His oldest son Toni also became a professional footballer and is signed to German Regionalliga side VfR Aalen.

Career statistics

Club

International

Coaching record

Honours

Player
Sturm Graz
Austrian Bundesliga: 1997–98, 1998–99
Austrian Cup: 1995–96, 1996–97, 1998–99
Austrian Supercup: 1996, 1998, 1999

Austria Wien
Austrian Cup:  2004–05; runner-up: 2003–04

LASK
Austrian Football First League: 2006–07

Individual
Austrian Footballer of the Year: 1995, 1998, 1999, 2007
Austrian Bundesliga Top Scorer: 1995–96, 1999–2000
Austrian Football First League Top Scorer: 2005–06, 2006–07

Manager
FC Waidhofen/Ybbs
Regionalliga Ost: 2009–10

SV Mattersburg
Austrian Football First League: 2014–15

References

External links
 
 Player profile – EURO2008
 Profile – Austria Archive
  

1969 births
Living people
Footballers from Split, Croatia
Yugoslav emigrants to Austria
Naturalised citizens of Austria
Association football forwards
Yugoslav footballers
Croatian footballers
Austrian footballers
Austria international footballers
Austrian people of Croatian descent
1998 FIFA World Cup players
UEFA Euro 2008 players
RNK Split players
First Vienna FC players
FC Admira Wacker Mödling players
MSV Duisburg players
SK Sturm Graz players
Nagoya Grampus players
FK Austria Wien players
LASK players
Austrian Football Bundesliga players
2. Liga (Austria) players
Bundesliga players
J1 League players
Austrian expatriate footballers
Expatriate footballers in Germany
Austrian expatriate sportspeople in Germany
Expatriate footballers in Japan
Austrian expatriate sportspeople in Japan
Austrian football managers
FK Austria Wien managers
SV Mattersburg managers
FK Austria Wien non-playing staff
Croatian expatriate footballers
Croatian expatriate sportspeople in Germany